Lake County Tuberculosis Sanatorium, Nurses Home and Superintendent's House is a historic tuberculosis sanatorium located at Crown Point, Lake County, Indiana. The Nurses Home was built in 1930, and is a three-story, Georgian Revival style brick building on a raised concrete basement. It has a hipped roof with pediment.  It features a three-bay projecting entrance portico with an arcade and variation of Corinthian order pilasters. The Superintendent's House was built in 1930, and is a -story, Colonial Revival style brick building with a one-story flat roofed wing. The Lake County Tuberculosis Sanatorium closed around 1971.

It was added to the National Register of Historic Places in 2005, with a boundary increase in 2013.

References

Residential buildings on the National Register of Historic Places in Indiana
Houses on the National Register of Historic Places in Indiana
Georgian Revival architecture in Indiana
Colonial Revival architecture in Indiana
Hospital buildings completed in 1930
Houses completed in 1930
Buildings and structures in Lake County, Indiana
National Register of Historic Places in Lake County, Indiana